Gustavo Villapalos Salas (15 October 1949 – 15 June 2021) was a Spanish academic and politician. He was rector of Complutense University of Madrid from 1987 to 1995.

References

1949 births
2021 deaths
Spanish jurists
Government ministers of the Community of Madrid
People's Party (Spain) politicians
Academic staff of the Complutense University of Madrid
Recipients of the Order of Merit (Portugal)